Logarovci is a village in the Municipality of Križevci in northeastern Slovenia. The area traditionally belonged to the Styria region. The municipality is now included in the Mura Statistical Region.

A village chapel-shrine was built in 1912 in the Neo-Gothic style.

References

External links
Logarovci on Geopedia

Populated places in the Municipality of Križevci